Arnett Elysus Girardeau Sr. (July 15, 1929 – October 26, 2017) was an American dentist and former politician in the state of Florida.

Girardeau was born in 1929 in Jacksonville, Florida. He graduated from Howard University where he earned a D.D.S. degree; he also attended graduate school at Wayne State University and Fisk University. The first African-American elected outside of Miami since Reconstruction, Girardueau served in the Florida House of Representatives from 1976 to 1983.
In 1982, he was elected to the State Senate and he served until 1992. He was president pro tempore of the senate in the later years of his term. Girardeau died on October 26, 2017 at the age of 88.

References

1929 births
2017 deaths
African-American state legislators in Florida
Democratic Party members of the Florida House of Representatives
Democratic Party Florida state senators
Howard University alumni
American dentists
Wayne State University alumni
Fisk University alumni
Politicians from Jacksonville, Florida
20th-century American politicians
20th-century dentists
20th-century African-American politicians
21st-century African-American people